Tarbaj is a small town and Sub-County in Kenya's Wajir County.

History
Tarbaj is a small remote uncultivated desert town in the Wajir County of Kenya, located near the Somali border. However, in recent times, the town has increasingly developed into a resource hub of online learning as a gap of education in Africa.

References 

Populated places in North Eastern Province (Kenya)
Wajir County